Abernant may refer to:

Places 
United Kingdom
 Abernant, Carmarthenshire, Wales
 Abernant, Powys, Wales
 Abernant, Rhondda Cynon Taf, Wales

United States
 Abernant, Alabama

Other uses
 Abernant (horse), an English thoroughbred racehorse